|}

The Gladness Stakes is a Group 3 flat horse race in Ireland open to horses aged three years or older. It is run over a distance of 7 furlongs (1,408 metres) at the Curragh in April.

History
The event is named after Gladness, a successful Irish-trained racehorse in the 1950s. It was established in 1963, and was initially contested over 1 mile and 2 furlongs. It was shortened to a mile in 1964, and cut to its present length in 1970.

For a period the Gladness Stakes held Listed status. It used to be open to horses aged three or older. It was promoted to Group 3 level in 1987, and closed to three-year-olds in 2004. It was re-opened to three-year-olds from 2014.

Records
Most successful horse (2 wins):
 Mustameet – 2005, 2007
 Lancaster House – 2020, 2021

Leading jockey (4 wins):
 George McGrath – Signa Infesta (1968), Rocked (1969), Pardner (1972), Rare April (1977)

Leading trainer (8 wins):
 Vincent O'Brien – Nijinsky (1970), Minsky (1971), Dapper (1973), Apalachee (1974), Night Alert (1980), Lomond (1983), El Gran Senor (1984), Great Lakes (1990)

Winners since 1981

Earlier winners

 1963: Christmas Island
 1964: Khalkis
 1965: Western Wind
 1966: Not So Cold
 1967: Sparrow Hawk
 1968: Signa Infesta
 1969: Rocked
 1970: Nijinsky
 1971: Minsky
 1972: Pardner
 1973: Dapper
 1974: Apalachee
 1975: It's Freezing
 1976: Sovereign Dice
 1977: Rare April
 1978: Icelandic
 1979: Secret of Success
 1980: Night Alert

See also
 Horse racing in Ireland
 List of Irish flat horse races

References

 Racing Post:

 galopp-sieger.de – Gladness Stakes.
 ifhaonline.org – International Federation of Horseracing Authorities – Gladness Stakes (2019).
 irishracinggreats.com – Gladness Stakes (Group 3).
 pedigreequery.com – Gladness Stakes – Curragh.

Open mile category horse races
Curragh Racecourse
Flat races in Ireland
1963 establishments in Ireland
Recurring sporting events established in 1963